Darren Hawkins (born April 15, 1966) is an American professor and the current chair of the department of Political Science at Brigham Young University. Hawkins is an expert on international conventions and international law. He has written many articles in this field.

Hawkins received his bachelor's degree from the University of Utah. He has an M.A. and a Ph.D. in political science, both from the University of Wisconsin–Madison.

Prior to joining the BYU faculty Hawkins was a professor at Tulane University.

Among works by Hawkins is the book International Human Rights and Authoritarian Rule in Chile. He was also an editor of the book Delegation and Agency in International Organization. Hawkins also wrote, with Jay Goodliffe, the article "Explaining Commitment: States and the Convention against Torture" in the journal Politics.

Sources

BYU profile
listing of many publications by Hawkins
Amazon.com listing
Harvard Human Rights Journal review of International Human Rights and Authoritarian Rule in Chile
Europebook review of Hawkins work
Country Book Shop entry

American political scientists
Brigham Young University faculty
1966 births
Living people
Tulane University faculty
University of Utah alumni
University of Wisconsin–Madison College of Letters and Science alumni